Photoperiodism is the physiological reaction of organisms to the length of night or a dark period. It occurs in plants and animals. Plant photoperiodism can also be defined as the developmental responses of plants to the relative lengths of light and dark periods. They are classified under three groups according to the photoperiods: short-day plants, long-day plants, and day-neutral plants.

Plants 
 

Many flowering plants (angiosperms) use a photoreceptor protein, such as phytochrome or cryptochrome, to sense seasonal changes in night length, or photoperiod, which they take as signals to flower. In a further subdivision, obligate photoperiodic plants absolutely require a long or short enough night before flowering, whereas facultative photoperiodic plants are more likely to flower under one condition.

Phytochrome comes in two forms: Pr and Pfr. Red light (which is present during the day) converts phytochrome to its active form (Pfr) which then stimulates various processes such as germination, flowering or branching. In comparison, plants receive more far-red in the shade, and this converts phytochrome from Pfr to its inactive form, Pr, inhibiting germination. This system of Pfr to Pr conversion allows the plant to sense when it is night and when it is day.  Pfr can also be converted back to Pr by a process known as dark reversion, where long periods of darkness trigger the conversion of Pfr. This is important in regards to plant flowering. Experiments by Halliday et al. showed that manipulations of the red-to far-red ratio in Arabidopsis can alter flowering. They discovered that plants tend to flower later when exposed to more red light, proving that red light is inhibitory to flowering. Other experiments have proven this  by exposing plants to extra red-light in the middle of the night. A short-day plant will not flower if light is turned on for a few minutes in the middle of the night and a long-day plant can flower if exposed to more red-light in the middle of the night.

Cryptochromes are another type of photoreceptor that is important in photoperiodism. Cryptochromes absorb blue light and UV-A. Cryptochromes entrain the circadian clock to light. It has been found that both cryptochrome and phytochrome abundance relies on light and the amount of cryptochrome can change depending on day-length. This shows how important both of the photoreceptors are in regards to determining day-length.

In 1920, W. W. Garner and H. A. Allard published their discoveries on photoperiodism and felt it was the length of daylight that was critical, but it was later discovered that the length of the night was the controlling factor. Photoperiodic flowering plants are classified as long-day plants or short-day plants even though night is the critical factor because of the initial misunderstanding about daylight being the controlling factor. Along with long-day plants and short-day plants, there are plants that fall into a "dual-day length category". These plants are either long-short-day plants (LSDP) or short-long-day plants (SLDP). LSDPs flower after a series of long days followed by short days whereas SLDPs flower after a series of short days followed by long days.   Each plant has a different length critical photoperiod, or critical night length.

Modern biologists believe that it is the coincidence of the active forms of phytochrome or cryptochrome, created by light during the daytime, with the rhythms of the circadian clock that allows plants to measure the length of the night. Other than flowering, photoperiodism in plants includes the growth of stems or roots during certain seasons and the loss of leaves. Artificial lighting can be used to induce extra-long days.

Long-day plants 

Long-day plants flower when the night length falls below their critical photoperiod. These plants typically flower during late spring or early summer as days are getting longer. In the northern hemisphere, the longest day of the year (summer solstice) is on or about 21 June. After that date, days grow shorter (i.e. nights grow longer) until 21 December (the winter solstice). This situation is reversed in the southern hemisphere (i.e., longest day is 21 December and shortest day is 21 June).

Some long-day obligate plants are:
 Carnation (Dianthus)
 Henbane (Hyoscyamus)
 Oat (Avena)

Some long-day facultative plants are:
 Pea (Pisum sativum)
 Barley (Hordeum vulgare)
 Lettuce (Lactuca sativa)
 Wheat (Triticum aestivum)

 Short-day plants 

Short-day plants flower when the night lengths exceed their critical photoperiod. They cannot flower under short nights or if a pulse of artificial light is shone on the plant for several minutes during the night; they require a continuous period of darkness before floral development can begin. Natural nighttime light, such as moonlight or lightning, is not of sufficient brightness or duration to interrupt flowering.

In general, short-day (i.e. long-night) plants flower as days grow shorter (and nights grow longer) after 21 June in the northern hemisphere, which is during summer or fall. The length of the dark period required to induce flowering differs among species and varieties of a species.

Photoperiodism affects flowering by inducing the shoot to produce floral buds instead of leaves and lateral buds.

Some short-day facultative plants are:

 Kenaf ( Hibiscus cannabinus)
 Marijuana (Cannabis)
 Cotton (Gossypium)
 Rice (Oryza)
 Sorghum (Sorghum bicolor)
 Green gram (Mung bean, Vigna radiata)
 Soybeans (Glycine max)

 Day-neutral plants 
Day-neutral plants, such as cucumbers, roses, tomatoes, and Ruderalis (autoflowering cannabis) do not initiate flowering based on photoperiodism. Instead, they may initiate flowering after attaining a certain overall developmental stage or age, or in response to alternative environmental stimuli, such as vernalisation (a period of low temperature).

 Animals 

Daylength, and thus knowledge of the season of the year, is vital to many animals. A number of biological and behavioural changes are dependent on this knowledge. Together with temperature changes, photoperiod provokes changes in the color of fur and feathers, migration, entry into hibernation, sexual behaviour, and even the resizing of sexual organs.

The singing frequency of birds such as the canary depends on the photoperiod. In the spring, when the photoperiod increases (more daylight), the male canary's testes grow. As the testes grow, more androgens are secreted and song frequency increases. During autumn, when the photoperiod decreases (less daylight), the male canary's testes regress and androgen levels drop dramatically, resulting in decreased singing frequency. Not only is singing frequency dependent on the photoperiod but the song repertoire is also. The long photoperiod of spring results in a greater song repertoire. Autumn's shorter photoperiod results in a reduction in song repertoire. These behavioral photoperiod changes in male canaries are caused by changes in the song center of the brain. As the photoperiod increases, the high vocal center (HVC) and the robust nucleus of the archistriatum (RA) increase in size. When the photoperiod decreases, these areas of the brain regress.

In mammals, daylength is registered in the suprachiasmatic nucleus (SCN), which is informed by retinal light-sensitive ganglion cells, which are not involved in vision. The information travels through the retinohypothalamic tract (RHT). Some mammals are highly seasonal, while humans' seasonality is largely believed to be evolutionary baggage.

 See also 
 Chronobiology
 Circadian clock
 Circadian rhythm
 Florigen
 Photobiology
 Scotobiology

 References 

 Further reading 
 D.E. Fosket, Plant Growth & Development, A Molecular Approach.  Academic Press, San Diego, 1994, p. 495.
 B. Thomas and D. Vince-Prue, Photoperiodism in plants (2nd ed).'' Academic Press, 1997

Zoology
Animal physiology
Botany
Plant physiology
Circadian rhythm
Biology terminology